Mesoregion is a unit of intermediate territorial subdivision, between "microregion" and "macroregion".
The term may refer to:

 Mesoregion (Brazil), a statistical subdivision of Brazil
 Mesoregion (geomorphology), a geomorphological unit
 Mesoregion (geography), a geographical unit
 

Regions